The Shire of Yarrawonga was a local government area on the Murray River, in the Goulburn Valley region, about  northeast of Melbourne, the state capital of Victoria, Australia.

History

Yarrawonga was once part of the vast Echuca Road District, which formed in 1864 and becoming a shire in 1871. It extended along the south bank of the Murray River, from Mount Hope Creek in the west, to the Ovens River in the east.

Originally, Yarrawonga was part of the Shire of Tungamah, which, confusingly, was originally called the Shire of Yarrawonga, when it was first incorporated on 15 May 1878. On 17 April 1891, the East Riding, which contained the town of Yarrawonga, was severed and incorporated as the Shire of North Yarrawonga. After the original shire was renamed to Tungamah on 17 February 1893, North Yarrawonga was renamed Yarrawonga on 12 May 1893.

On 18 November 1994, the Shire of Yarrawonga was abolished, and along with the Shires of Cobram, Nathalia, Numurkah and Tungamah, was merged into the newly created Shire of Moira. The Peechelba district, however, was transferred to the newly created Rural City of Wangaratta.

Wards

The Shire of Yarrawonga was divided into four ridings, each of which elected three councillors:
 Eastern Town Riding
 Western Town Riding
 Eastern Rural Riding
 Western Rural Riding

Towns and localities
 Bathumi
 Boomahnoomoonah
 Bundalong
 Burramine
 Peechelba
 Wilby
 Yarrawonga*

* Council seat.

Population

* Estimate in the 1958 Victorian Year Book.

References

External links
 Victorian Places - Yarrawonga and Yarrawonga Shire

Yarrawonga